The 2010 European 10,000m Cup, was the 14th edition of the European 10,000m Cup took place on 5 June in Marseilles, France.

Individual

Men

Women

Team
In italic the participants whose result did not go into the team's total time, but awarded with medals.

References

External links
 EAA web site

European 10,000m Cup
European Cup 10,000m